Tugaske is a village in the Canadian province of Saskatchewan within the Rural Municipality of Huron No. 223 and Census Division No. 7. It is nicknamed Gateway to Lake Diefenbaker. It is near Eyebrow Lake, a prairie lake in the Qu'Appelle Valley. It was named after an eyebrow-shaped hill also in the Qu'Appelle Valley above Eyebrow Lake.  The lake, which is 9 km long and 1 km wide, is a bird sanctuary and is near Highway 627.

Highway 367 and Highway 627 intersect in the village.

History 
Tugaske incorporated as a village on May 7, 1909.

Climate

Demographics 

References 

Villages in Saskatchewan
Huron No. 223, Saskatchewan
Division No. 7, Saskatchewan